Mrudula is a 1990 Indian Malayalam film,  directed by Antony Eastman. The film stars Raghu, Mrudula, Jagathy Sreekumar and Captain Raju.

Cast
Raghu as Anirudh
Mrudula as Mridula
Jagathy Sreekumar as Porinchu
Captain Raju as Captain Ganesh
Prathapachandran as Menon
K. R. Savithri as Banumathiyamma
Latha Thomas
Mafia Sasi as Gunda

References

External links
 

1990 films
1990s Malayalam-language films